Rhulani Thembi Siweya is a South African politician who served as the Deputy Minister in the Presidency.

She has been a Member of the National Assembly of South Africa for the African National Congress since 2019.

References

External links
Profile at the Presidency
Profile at Parliament of South Africa

Living people
Year of birth missing (living people)
Place of birth missing (living people)
People from Limpopo
African National Congress politicians
Members of the National Assembly of South Africa
Government ministers of South Africa
Women members of the National Assembly of South Africa